Oscar Hale (February 27, 1867 – December 9, 1950) was a justice of the Iowa Supreme Court from January 1, 1939, to December 9, 1950, appointed from Louisa County, Iowa.

References

Justices of the Iowa Supreme Court
1867 births
1950 deaths